Mangione is a surname. Notable people with the surname include:

Chuck Mangione (born 1940), American flugelhorn player, trumpeter and composer
Francesco Mangione, Italian-born Australian, convicted of the murder of his 26-year-old cousin in 2002
Gap Mangione (born 1938), jazz pianist, composer, arranger, and bandleader from Rochester, New York, United States
Jerre Mangione (1909–1998), American writer and scholar of the Sicilian-American experience
Mike Mangione, American singer-songwriter, guitarist and percussionist
Salvatore Mangione, known as Salvo (1947–2015), Italian artist who lived and worked in Turin
Stéphane Mangione (born 1979), French football player

See also
Magion (disambiguation)
Magione
Mangone